is a Japanese idol. She is known as a member of the female musical group Momoiro Clover Z.

Her Momoiro Clover Z signature color is Pink. She is the youngest member of the group. Her self-introduction is: "I am a playful and little bit sexy idol of Momoclo Ayaka Sasaki a.k.a. Ārin!".

On July 24, 2021, it was reported Sasaki was hospitalized on July 23. She was diagnosed with right peripheral facial nerve paralysis. A concert that was scheduled for August 1, 2021 has been postponed.

Career 
Ayaka Sasaki was born on June 11, 1996, in Kanagawa, Japan.

Ayaka entered Momoiro Clover together with Yukina Kashiwa and Akari Hayami on November 23, 2008.

On October 12, 2012, she made a solo appearance in a special issue of the Japanese culture magazine QuickJapan. The 21-page material featuring her was titled "Summer Memories of a 16-year-old". It reported about Momoclo's summer of 2012 activities, included many photographs and a long interview with Ayaka.

Discography

Singles
 2016: 
 2017: 
 2018: Early SUMMER!!!
 2019: Bunny Gone Bad
 2019: 
 2020: 
 2021: A-rin Kingdom / SPECIALIZER
 2022: Lady Cat

Studio albums
 2017:

Compilation albums
 2020: A-rin Assort

Video albums
 2017: AYAKA-NATION 2016 in Yokohama Arena Live
 2018: Ayaka Nation 2017 In Ryogoku Kokugi Kan Live
 2019: Ayaka Nation 2019 In Yokohama Arena Live
 2021: A-CHANNEL
 2022: Ayaka Nation 2021 In Yokohama Arena Live

Appearances

Movies 
 Death Note: The Last Name (2006)
 Yoshimoto Director's 100 "Boku to Takeda-kun" (2007)
 Saint Seiya: Legend of Sanctuary (2014; voice of Saori Kido)
  (2015)

TV dramas 
  (2004, TBS)
 Hungry! (Ep. 8, February 28, 2012, Kansai TV)
  (2017, TV Tokyo)
 TBA:  (Tusk: Act 4)

TV variety shows 
 Oha Star (August 2005 — September 2007, TV Tokyo)
  (TBS)
  (Special edition, January 5, 2012)

Internet

Magazines 
 QuickJapan (Vol. 104, October 12, 2012, Ohta Publishing Co.)

References

External links 
 Ayaka Sasaki's official Stardust profile
 Momoiro Clover Z profile
 Ayaka Sasaki's official Ameblo blog (2011–present)
 

Momoiro Clover Z members
1996 births
Living people
Japanese idols
Japanese women pop singers
Japanese child actresses
Actresses from Kanagawa Prefecture
Stardust Promotion artists
Musicians from Kanagawa Prefecture
21st-century Japanese actresses
21st-century Japanese singers
21st-century Japanese women singers